The descending branch of occipital artery, the largest branch of the occipital, descends on the back of the neck, and divides into a superficial and deep portion.
 The superficial portion runs beneath the Splenius, giving off branches which pierce that muscle to supply the Trapezius and anastomose with the ascending branch of the transverse cervical. 
 The deep portion runs down between the Semispinales capitis and colli, and anastomoses with the vertebral and with the a. profunda cervicalis, a branch of the costocervical trunk.

The anastomosis between these vessels assists in establishing the collateral circulation after ligature of the common carotid or subclavian artery.

References 

Arteries of the head and neck